Ocnogyna anatolica is a moth of the family Erebidae. It was described by Thomas Joseph Witt in 1980. It is found in Turkey.

References

Spilosomina
Moths described in 1980